This is a list of chiefs of the Police of Armenia.

First Republic (1918–1920)

Minister of Internal Affairs of the First Republic of Armenia (1918–1920) 

 Aram Manukian (July 1918 – January 1919)
 Alexander Khatisian (February 1919 – August 1919)
 Abraham Gyulkhandanyan (August 1919 – May 1920)
 Ruben Ter-Minasian (May 1920 – September 1920)
 Sargis Araratyan (September 1920 – November 1920)
 Simon Vratsian (November 1920 – December 1920)

Armenian SSR (1920-1991)

People's Commissar of Interior Affairs of the Armenian SSR (1920–1941) 

 Isahak Dovlatyan (December 1921 – April 1921)
 Poghos Makintsyan (April 1921 – July 1921)
 Avis Nourijanyan (July 1921 – August 1921)
 Shavarsh Amirkhanyan (August 1921 – May 1924)
 Hovhannes Dourgaryan (May 1924 – July 1927)
 Sergey Melik-Hovsepyan (July 1927 – December 1928)
 Sedrak Margaryan (February 1929 – November, 1929)
 Hayk Petrosyan (November 1929 – May 1930)
 Sedrak Otyan (May 1930 – October 1930)
 Armenak Aboulyan (December 1930 – July, 1934)
 Khachik Moughdousi (July 1934 – September, 1937)
 Victor Khvorostov (November 1937 – March 1939)
 Aleksey Korotkov (March 1939 – March 1941)

Minister of Internal Affairs of the Armenian SSR (1941–1991) 

 Georgi Martirosov (March 1941 – May 1943, March 1953 – April 1954)
 Ivan Matevosov (May 1943 – August 1947)
 Khoren Grigoryan (August 1947 – March 1953)
 Pyotr Piskunov (April 1954 – August 1957)
 Hayk Melkonyan (August 1957 – August 1961)
 Sergey Arzoumanyan (August 1961 – December 1968)
 Vladimir Darbinyan (December 1968 – September 1974)
 Yevgeniy Patalov (December 1974 – November 1983)
 Haykaz Shahinyan (November 1983 – June 1988)
 Housik Haroutunyan (June 1988 – May 1990)
 Levon Galstyan (June 1990 – 1990 August)
 Karlos Ghazaryan (August 1990 – March 1991)

Republic of Armenia (since 1991)

Minister of Internal Affairs of the Republic of Armenia (1991-2003) 

 Ashot Manucharyan (March 1991 – December 1991)
 Valeri Poghosyan (December 1991 – February 1992)
 Vano Siradeghyan (February 1992 – November 1996)
 Serzh Sargsyan (November 1996 – June 1999)
 Suren Abrahamyan (June 1999 – November 1999)
 Hayk Haroutyunyan (November 1999 – January 2003)

Chief of Police of the Republic of Armenia (2003-present) 

 Hayk Haroutyunyan (January 2003 – May 29, 2008)
 Alik Sargsyan (May 29, 2008 – November 1, 2011)
 Vladimir Gasparyan (November 1, 2011 – May 10, 2018)
 Valeri Osipyan (May 10, 2018 – September 19, 2019)
 Arman Sargsyan (September 19, 2019 - June 8, 2020)
 Vahe Ghazaryan (June 8, 2020 – Present)

References 

Chiefs of Police
Chiefs of Police, Armenia